The 2015–16 Orlando Magic season was the 27th season of the franchise in the National Basketball Association (NBA). They began the season hoping to improve upon their 25–57 output the previous season. They managed to improve by 10 games, finishing 35–47, but had missed the playoffs for a fourth straight year.

Draft picks

Pre-season

|- style="background:#fbb;"
| 1
| October 3
| Charlotte
| 100–106
| Andrew Nicholson (23)
| Andrew Nicholson (8)
| C. J. Watson (5)
| Amway Center14,942
| 0–1
|- style="background:#bfb;"
| 2
| October 7
| vs. Miami
| 100–97
| Evan Fournier (18)
| Nikola Vučević (8)
| C. J. Watson (6)
| KFC Yum! Center6,123
| 1–1
|- style="background:#fbb;"
| 3
| October 9
| @ Indiana
| 92–97
| Victor Oladipo (15)
| Tobias Harris (13)
| Marble, Payton, Vučević (4)
| Allen County War Memorial Coliseum13,475
| 1–2
|- style="background:#bfb;"
| 4
| October 11
| @ Houston
| 123–119
| Roy Devyn Marble (21)
| Smith, Watson (7)
| Smith, Watson (5)
| State Farm Arena6,130
| 2–2
|- style="background:#bfb;"
| 5
| October 13
| Miami
| 95–92 OT
| Shabazz Napier (15)
| Dewayne Dedmon (13)
| C. J. Watson (7)
| Amway Center16,105
| 3–2
|- style="background:#bfb;"
| 6
| October 17
| @ Flamengo
| 90–73
| Nikola Vučević (18)
| Victor Oladipo (9)
| Victor Oladipo (3)
| HSBC Arena14,894
| 4–2
|- style="background:#bfb;"
| 7
| October 21
| New Orleans
| 110–107 OT
| Nikola Vučević (24)
| Nikola Vučević (14)
| C. J. Watson (7)
| Amway Center12,779
| 5–2
|- style="background:#bfb;"
| 8
| October 23
|  Memphis
| 86–76
| Tobias Harris (18)
| Dewayne Dedmon (11)
| Shabazz Napier (8)
| Amway Center12,155
| 6–2

Regular season

Standings

Game log

Regular season

|- style="background:#fbb;"
| 1
| October 28
| Washington
| 
| Victor Oladipo (17)
| Victor Oladipo (11)
| Elfrid Payton (8)
| Amway Center18,846
| 0–1
|- style="background:#fbb;"
| 2
| October 30
| Oklahoma City
| 
| Tobias Harris (30)
| Victor Oladipo (13)
| Victor Oladipo (10)
| Amway Center18,846
| 0–2

|- style="background:#fbb;"
| 3
| November 1
| @ Chicago
| 
| Evan Fournier (19)
| Nikola Vučević (11)
| Victor Oladipo (5)
| United Center21,585
| 0–3
|- style="background:#bfb;"
| 4
| November 3
| @ New Orleans
| 
| Evan Fournier (30)
| Harris, Vučević (13)
| Elfrid Payton (10)
| Smoothie King Center16,876
| 1–3
|- style="background:#fbb;"
| 5
| November 4
| @ Houston
| 
| Evan Fournier (29)
| Aaron Gordon (8)
| Elfrid Payton (7)
| Toyota Center16,735
| 1–4
|- style="background:#bfb;"
| 6
| November 6
| Toronto
| 
| Tobias Harris (20)
| Tobias Harris (9)
| Oladipo, Napier (6)
| Amway Center16,578
| 2–4
|- style="background:#bfb;"
| 7
| November 7
| @ Philadelphia
| 
| Elfrid Payton (20)
| Dewayne Dedmon (9)
| C. J. Watson (7)
| Wells Fargo Center15,207
| 3–4
|- style="background:#fbb;"
| 8
| November 9
| @ Indiana
| 
| Evan Fournier (21)
| Tobias Harris (10)
| Elfrid Payton (7)
| Bankers Life Fieldhouse13,104
| 3–5
|- style="background:#bfb;"
| 9
| November 11
| L.A. Lakers
| 
| Shabazz Napier (22)
| Tobias Harris (11)
| Elfrid Payton (8)
| Amway Center18,846
| 4–5
|- style="background:#bfb;"
| 10
| November 13
| Utah
| 
| Evan Fournier (21)
| Tobias Harris (13)
| Elfrid Payton (6)
| Amway Center16,709
| 5–5
|- style="background:#fbb;"
| 11
| November 14
| @ Washington
| 
| Nikola Vučević (19)
| Nikola Vučević (13)
| Evan Fournier (6)
| Verizon Center18,311
| 5–6
|- style="background:#bfb;"
| 12
| November 18
| Minnesota
| 
| Evan Fournier (26)
| Tobias Harris (11)
| Elfrid Payton (6)
| Amway Center16,048
| 6–6
|- style="background:#fbb;"
| 13
| November 21
| Sacramento
| 
| Tobias Harris (24)
| Nikola Vučević (11)
| Elfrid Payton (9)
| Amway Center16,104
| 6–7
|- style="background:#fbb;"
| 14
| November 23
| @ Cleveland
| 
| Andrew Nicholson (18)
| Andrew Nicholson (8)
| Shabazz Napier (9)
| Quicken Loans Arena20,562
| 6–8
|- style="background:#bfb;"
| 15
| November 25
| New York
| 
| Victor Oladipo (24)
| Nikola Vučević (12)
| Elfrid Payton (11)
| Amway Center18,846
| 7–8
|- style="background:#bfb;"
| 16
| November 27
| Milwaukee
| 
| Elfrid Payton (22)
| Andrew Nicholson (7)
| Elfrid Payton (10)
| Amway Center16,317
| 8–8
|- style="background:#bfb;"
| 17
| November 29
| Boston
| 
| Victor Oladipo (19)
| Tobias Harris (11)
| Victor Oladipo (6)
| Amway Center16,209
| 9–8

|- style="background:#bfb;"
| 18
| December 1
| @ Minnesota
| 
| Nikola Vučević (18)
| Nikola Vučević (12)
| Elfrid Payton (5)
| Target Center10,694
| 10–8
|- style="background:#bfb;"
| 19
| December 3
| @ Utah
| 
| Tobias Harris (17)
| Nikola Vučević (8)
| Elfrid Payton (7)
| Vivint Smart Home Arena19,247
| 11–8
|- style="background:#fbb;"
| 20
| December 5
| @ L.A. Clippers
| 
| Victor Oladipo (24)
| Harris, Vučević (10)
| Elfrid Payton (8)
| Staples Center19,146
| 11–9
|- style="background:#bfb;"
| 21
| December 8
| @ Denver
| 
| Payton, Vučević (18)
| Andrew Nicholson (14)
| Elfrid Payton (4)
| Pepsi Center13,925
| 12–9
|- style="background:#fbb;"
| 22
| December 9
| @ Phoenix
| 
| Nikola Vučević (21)
| Nikola Vučević (12)
| Elfrid Payton (10)
| Talking Stick Resort Arena17,637
| 12–10
|- style="background:#fbb;"
| 23
| December 11
| Cleveland
| 
| Nikola Vučević (14)
| Andrew Nicholson (6)
| Shabazz Napier (5)
| Amway Center17,239
| 12–11
|- style="background:#bfb;"
| 24
| December 14
| @ Brooklyn
| 
| Nikola Vučević (18)
| Tobias Harris (9)
| Frye, Payton (5)
| Barclays Center12,946
| 13–11
|- style="background:#bfb;"
| 25
| December 16
| Charlotte
| 
| Channing Frye (17)
| Nikola Vučević (8)
| Elfrid Payton (9)
| Amway Center16,019
| 14–11
|- style="background:#bfb;"
| 26
| December 18
| Portland
| 
| Harris, Vučević (25)
| Tobias Harris (12)
| Victor Oladipo (6)
| Amway Center17,156
| 15–11
|- style="background:#fbb;"
| 27
| December 20
| Atlanta
| 
| Nikola Vučević (20)
| Nikola Vučević (11)
| Oladipo, Payton (6)
| Amway Center16,982
| 15–12
|- style="background:#bfb;"
| 28
| December 21
| @ New York
| 
| Nikola Vučević (26)
| Nikola Vučević (9)
| Shabazz Napier (6)
| Madison Square Garden19,812
| 16–12
|- style="background:#bfb;"
| 29
| December 23
| Houston
| 
| Nikola Vučević (21)
| Tobias Harris (8)
| Elfrid Payton (9)
| Amway Center17,061
| 17–12
|- style="background:#fbb;"
| 30
| December 26
| Miami
| 
| Nikola Vučević (22)
| Nikola Vučević (10)
| Fournier, Payton (7)
| Amway Center18,846
| 17–13
|- style="background:#bfb;"
| 31
| December 28
| New Orleans
| 
| Nikola Vučević (28)
| Tobias Harris (9)
| Nikola Vučević (7)
| Amway Center17,606
| 18–13
|- style="background:#bfb;"
| 32
| December 30
| Brooklyn
| 
| Nikola Vučević (20)
| Nikola Vučević (9)
| Evan Fournier (5)
| Amway Center18,397
| 19–13

|- style="background:#fbb;"
| 33
| January 1
| @ Washington
| 
| Victor Oladipo (20)
| Tobias Harris (10)
| Elfrid Payton (7)
| Verizon Center16,986
| 19–14
|- style="background:#fbb;"
| 34
| January 2
| @ Cleveland
| 
| Aaron Gordon (11)
| Aaron Gordon (7)
| Elfrid Payton (4)
| Quicken Loans Arena20,562
| 19–15
|- style="background:#fbb;"
| 35
| January 4
| @ Detroit
| 
| Victor Oladipo (18)
| Victor Oladipo (7)
| Victor Oladipo (5)
| The Palace of Auburn Hills14,301
| 19–16
|- style="background:#fbb;"
| 36
| January 6
| Indiana
| 
| Victor Oladipo (20)
| Aaron Gordon (8)
| Evan Fournier (4)
| Amway Center18,846
| 19–17
|- style="background:#bfb;"
| 37
| January 8
| @ Brooklyn
| 
| Oladipo, Vučević (20)
| Tobias Harris (12)
| Tobias Harris (8)
| Barclays Center13,907
| 20–17
|- style="background:#fbb;"
| 38
| January 9
| Washington
| 
| Nikola Vučević (23)
| Aaron Gordon (10)
| Oladipo, Vučević (5)
| Amway Center18,058
| 20–18
|- style="background:#fbb;"
| 39
| January 14
| Toronto
| 
| Victor Oladipo (27)
| Harris, Vučević (11)
| Victor Oladipo (6)
| The O2 Arena(London, England/NBA Global Games)18,689
| 20–19
|- style="background:#fbb;"
| 40
| January 18
| @ Atlanta
| 
| Aaron Gordon (18)
| Nikola Vučević (11)
| Elfrid Payton (5)
| Philips Arena17,460
| 20–20
|- style="background:#fbb;"
| 41
| January 20
| Philadelphia
| 
| Elfrid Payton (21)
| Nikola Vučević (11)
| Elfrid Payton (10)
| Amway Center17,746
| 20–21
|- style="background:#fbb;"
| 42
| January 22
| Charlotte
| 
| Victor Oladipo (29)
| Nikola Vučević (12)
| Elfrid Payton (10)
| Amway Center18,083
| 20–22
|- style="background:#fbb;"
| 43
| January 25
| @ Memphis
| 
| Fournier, Harris, Vučević (16)
| Nikola Vučević (14)
| Elfrid Payton (6)
| FedExForum15,779
| 20–23
|- style="background:#fbb;"
| 44
| January 26
| @ Milwaukee
| 
| Victor Oladipo (18)
| Nikola Vučević (12)
| Victor Oladipo (5)
| BMO Harris Bradley Center11,884
| 20–24
|- style="background:#fbb;"
| 45
| January 29
| @ Boston
| 
| Nikola Vučević (14)
| Aaron Gordon (9)
| Nikola Vučević (4)
| TD Garden17,729
| 20–25
|- style="background:#bfb;"
| 46
| January 31
| Boston
| 
| Evan Fournier (24)
| Aaron Gordon (14)
| Nikola Vučević (7)
| Amway Center18,846
| 21–25

|- style="background:#fbb;"
| 47
| February 1
| @ San Antonio
| 
| Nikola Vučević (20)
| Aaron Gordon (16)
| Elfrid Payton (8)
| AT&T Center18,418
| 21–26
|- style="background:#fbb;"
| 48
| February 3
| @ Oklahoma City
| 
| Victor Oladipo (37)
| Harris, Oladipo (7)
| Elfrid Payton (6)
| Chesapeake Energy Arena18,203
| 21–27
|- style="background:#fbb;"
| 49
| February 5
| L.A. Clippers
| 
| Victor Oladipo (18)
| Nikola Vučević (9)
| Napier, Vucevic (4)
| Amway Center16,647
| 21–28
|- style="background:#bfb;"
| 50
| February 7
| Atlanta
| 
| Nikola Vučević (22)
| Aaron Gordon (13)
| Elfrid Payton (12)
| Amway Center16,021
| 22–28
|- style="background:#bfb;"
| 51
| February 8
| @ Atlanta
| 
| Nikola Vučević (28)
| Nikola Vučević (13)
| Victor Oladipo (8)
| Philips Arena13,057
| 23–28
|- style="background:#fbb;"
| 52
| February 10
| San Antonio
| 
| Evan Fournier (28)
| Aaron Gordon (14)
| Elfrid Payton (7)
| Amway Center17,467
| 23–29
|- align="center"
|colspan="9" bgcolor="#bbcaff"|All-Star Break
|- style="background:#bfb;"
| 53
| February 19
| Dallas
| 
| Nikola Vučević (21)
| Victor Oladipo (14)
| Evan Fournier (8)
| Amway Center17,764
| 24–29
|- style="background:#fbb;"
| 54
| February 21
| Indiana
| 
| Evan Fournier (23)
| Nikola Vučević (13)
| Victor Oladipo (8)
| Amway Center17,242
| 24–30
|- style="background:#bfb;"
| 55
| February 23
| @ Philadelphia
| 
| Nikola Vučević (35)
| Aaron Gordon (11)
| Elfrid Payton (8)
| Wells Fargo Center13,745
| 25–30
|- style="background:#fbb;"
| 56
| February 25
| Golden State
| 
| Evan Fournier (20)
| Nikola Vučević (9)
| Elfrid Payton (6)
| Amway Center19,189
| 25–31
|- style="background:#fbb;"
| 57
| February 26
| @ New York
| 
| Nikola Vučević (18)
| Gordon, Vučević (8)
| Elfrid Payton (9)
| Madison Square Garden19,812
| 25–32
|- style="background:#bfb;"
| 58
| February 28
| Philadelphia
| 
| Oladipo, Vučević (28)
| Aaron Gordon (7)
| Elfrid Payton (10)
| Amway Center16,168
| 26–32

|- style="background:#fbb;"
| 59
| March 1
| @ Dallas
| 
| Ersan İlyasova (22)
| Ersan İlyasova (10)
| C. J. Watson (6)
| American Airlines Center19,546
| 26–33
|- style="background:#bfb;"
| 60
| March 2
| Chicago
| 
| Nikola Vučević (24)
| Aaron Gordon (15)
| Elfrid Payton (12)
| Amway Center16,072
| 27–33
|- style="background:#fbb;"
| 61
| March 4
| Phoenix
| 
| Elfrid Payton (19)
| İlyasova, Vučević (12)
| Elfrid Payton (11)
| Amway Center17,546
| 27–34
|- style="background:#fbb;"
| 62
| March 7
| @ Golden State
| 
| Fournier, Gordon, Jennings (20)
| Aaron Gordon (16)
| Victor Oladipo (8)
| Oracle Arena19,596
| 27–35
|- style="background:#fbb;"
| 63
| March 8
| @ L.A. Lakers
| 
| Victor Oladipo (26)
| Dewayne Dedmon (10)
| C.J. Watson (5)
| Staples Center18,997
| 27–36
|- style="background:#bfb;"
| 64
| March 11
| @ Sacramento
| 
| Aaron Gordon (20)
| Aaron Gordon (11)
| Evan Fournier (6)
| Sleep Train Arena17,081
| 28–36
|- style="background:#fbb;"
| 65
| March 12
| @ Portland
| 
| Victor Oladipo (18)
| Ersan İlyasova (9)
| C.J. Watson (4)
| Moda Center19,452
| 28–37
|- style="background:#bfb;"
| 66
| March 15
| Denver
| 
| Evan Fournier (30)
| Jason Smith (13)
| Brandon Jennings (11)
| Amway Center16,988
| 29–37
|- style="background:#fbb;"
| 67
| March 16
| @ Charlotte
| 
| Victor Oladipo (25)
| Brandon Jennings (8)
| C.J. Watson (7)
| Time Warner Cable Arena16,148
| 29–38
|- style="background:#fbb;"
| 68
| March 18
| Cleveland
| 
| Victor Oladipo (45)
| Aaron Gordon (10)
| Brandon Jennings (7)
| Amway Center18,046
| 29–39
|- style="background:#fbb;"
| 69
| March 20
| @ Toronto
| 
| Fournier, Oladipo (21)
| İlyasova, Nicholson (9)
| Brandon Jennings (7)
| Air Canada Centre19.800
| 29–40
|- style="background:#fbb;"
| 70
| March 21
| @ Boston
| 
| Victor Oladipo (25)
| Gordon, Oladipo (9)
| Elfrid Payton (11)
| TD Garden18,624
| 29–41
|- style="background:#fbb;"
| 71
| March 23
| @ Detroit
| 
| Elfrid Payton (20)
| Aaron Gordon (11)
| Elfrid Payton (10)
| The Palace of Auburn Hills16,609
| 29–42
|- style="background:#fbb;"
| 72
| March 25
| @ Miami
| 
| Evan Fournier (20)
| Fournier, Payton (7)
| Elfrid Payton (7)
| American Airlines Arena19,918
| 29–43
|- style="background:#bfb;"
| 73
| March 26
| Chicago
| 
| Dewayne Dedmon (18)
| Dewayne Dedmon (13)
| Elfrid Payton (10)
| Amway Center18,846
| 30–43
|- style="background:#bfb;"
| 74
| March 29
| Brooklyn
| 
| Andrew Nicholson (24)
| Payton, Smith (5)
| Elfrid Payton (12)
| Amway Center17,536
| 31–43
|- style="background:#bfb;"
| 75
| March 31
| @ Indiana
| 
| Evan Fournier (25)
| Payton, Oladipo (7)
| Victor Oladipo (7)
| Bankers Life Fieldhouse17,234
| 32–43

|- style="background:#fbb;"
| 76
| April 1
| @ Milwaukee
| 
| Nikola Vučević (26)
| Aaron Gordon (7)
| Elfrid Payton (10)
| BMO Harris Bradley Center16,268
| 32–44
|- style="background:#bfb;"
| 77
| April 3
| Memphis
| 
| Nikola Vučević (25)
| Nikola Vučević (10)
| Elfrid Payton (11)
| Amway Center17,741
| 33–44
|- style="background:#fbb;"
| 78
| April 6
| Detroit
| 
| Evan Fournier (19)
| Nikola Vučević (13)
| Elfrid Payton (5)
| Amway Center16,553
| 33–45
|- style="background:#bfb;"
| 79
| April 8
| Miami
| 
| Nikola Vučević (29)
| Evan Fournier (7)
| Elfrid Payton (10)
| Amway Center18,152
| 34–45
|- style="background:#fbb;"
| 80
| April 10
| @ Miami
| 
| Evan Fournier (21)
| Nikola Vučević (8)
| Evan Fournier (5)
| American Airlines Arena19,913
| 34–46
|- style="background:#bfb;"
| 81
| April 11
| Milwaukee
| 
| Ersan İlyasova (22)
| Dewayne Dedmon (8)
| Elfrid Payton (11)
| Amway Center18,374
| 35–46
|- style="background:#fbb;"
| 82
| April 13
| @ Charlotte
| 
| Fournier, Gordon (22)
| Ersan İlyasova (7)
| Elfrid Payton (7)
| Time Warner Cable Arena17,372
| 35–47

Roster

Transactions

Trades

Free agents

Re-signed

Additions

Subtractions

References

Orlando Magic seasons
Orlando Magic
Orlando Magic
Orlando Magic